Quiller is a British drama television series starring Michael Jayston. The series premièred with the episode The Price of Violence on 29 August 1975 on BBC One. Quiller is the alias of a fictional spy created by English novelist Elleston Trevor who featured in a series of Cold War thrillers written under the pseudonym "Adam Hall".

The second episode's script - Tango Briefing - was written by "Adam Hall", adapted from his own novel of the same name. All the other episodes were written for the series.

Although all episodes survived destruction, the series has never been repeated on the BBC or other channels since its original transmission nor is it currently available online, on Blu-ray or DVD.

Background
Quiller (Michael Jayston) works for a British secret organisation known simply as "The Bureau". This organisation dispatches Quiller on various missions across the globe to retrieve missing documentation, prevent secrets from falling into the hands of the enemy, rescue "sleepers", safely repatriate defecting agents or eliminate those whom Her Majesty's Government wishes to disappear. His controller at "The Bureau" is Angus Kinloch (Moray Watson) and the only other series regular is Rosalind (Sinéad Cusack).

Production
The series followed the standard format of BBC Dramas of the time; shooting locations on 16" film with studio VT for the interiors. Unusually foreign location filming was undertaken for many episodes; Malta (standing in for several countries) and Germany. Also unusually for a BBC drama, much library stock footage was utilised.

Cast and characters
 Michael Jayston as Quiller (13 episodes)
 Moray Watson as Angus Kinloch (13 episodes)
 Sinéad Cusack as Rosalind (3 episodes)
 Nigel Stock (2 episodes)
 Prunella Gee (2 episodes)
 Lon Satton (2 episodes)

Season 1

Episodes

References

External links

BBC television dramas
1970s British drama television series
1975 British television series debuts
1975 British television series endings
Espionage television series
English-language television shows